This is a list of people who have appeared on the postage stamps of Portugal

A 

 Adam, first man, according to the Bible (1998)
 Afonso I, king (1926; 1940; 1947; 1955; 2009)
 Afonso II, king (1955)
 Afonso III, king (1955)
 Afonso IV, king (1955)
 Afonso V, king (1994; 1996)
 Alfonso de Portugal, Grandmaster (2013)
 Joaquim Agostinho, cyclist (2005)
 Agrippina the Elder, Roman matron (1993)
 Albert I, prince of Monaco (1996)
 Matias de Albuquerque, colonial administrator (1928)
 , tenor (2001)
 Woody Allen, American filmmaker, actor and musician (2000)
 Brites de Almeida, heroine of Independence (1927)
 José de Almada Negreiros, painter (Self-Portrait 1993; 2005)
 António José de Almeida, politician (1979)
 Almeida Garrett, poet, playwright, novelist (1957; 1999)
 Nuno Álvares Pereira, general, saint (1926; 1928; 1931; 1933; 1949; 2009)
 Dino Alves , fashion designer (2004)
 Laura Alves, actress (1996)
 Manuel Alves , fashion designer (2004)
 Amélia de Orleães, queen (2005)
 José de Anchieta, missionary (1997)
 Angel of the Annunciation, archangel (1993)
 Carolina Beatriz Ângelo, feminist (2009)
 António de Lisboa, Franciscan saint (1895; 1931; 1933; 1981; 1995)
 , cartoonist (2005)
 , foundation president (1996)

B 

 Robert Baden-Powell, British general and founder of scouting (2007)
 Nuno Baltazar , fashion designer (2004)
 João de Barros, historian (1996)
 Bartolomeu dos Mártires, theologian and archbishop (1990)
 Alexander Graham Bell, Scottish inventor (1976)
 Manuel Maria Barbosa du Bocage, poet (1966)
 Miguel Bombarda, psychiatrist and politician (2001)
 João Domingos Bomtempo, composer (1974)
 José Bonifácio, Brazilian statesman (1972)
 Columbano Bordalo Pinheiro, painter (2007)
 Rafael Bordalo Pinheiro, artist, cartoonist (1992; 2005)
 Teófilo Braga, writer and politician (1979)
 Fernando II, Duke of Braganza, nobleman (1965)
 João Carlos de Bragança, nobleman (1980)
 Louis Braille, musician and inventor of braille (2009)
 João Branco , fashion designer (2004)
 João de Brito, missionary and saint (1948)
 Félix Avelar Brotero, botanist (1944)
 Luís Buchinho, fashion designer (2004)

C 

 Adelaide Cabete, physician and feminist (2009)
 Pedro Álvares Cabral, explorer (1945; 1969; 1992; 2000)
 Juan Rodríguez Cabrillo, explorer (1969; 1994)
 , bacteriologist (1966; 1999)
 Luís de Camões, poet (1898; 1911; 1924; 1972; 1980)
 Diogo Cão, explorer (1945; 1986; 1991)
 Bento de Jesus Caraça, mathematician (2001)
 Carlos I, king (1892–93; 1895–96; 1996)
 António Óscar Carmona, president  (1934; 1945; 1970)
 , cartoonist (2005)
 Rómulo de Carvalho, poet (2006)
 Camilo Castelo Branco, writer (1925; 1990)
 Álvaro de Castro, politician (1980)
 João de Castro, viceroy of India (1994)
 Ana de Castro Osório, feminist writer (2009)
 João Chagas, journalist and politician (1979)
 , cartoonist (2005)
 , physician (1999)
  journalist (1964)
 Christopher Columbus, explorer (1988 - Madeira, 1992)
 José Correia da Serra, naturalist (1966)
 João Vaz Corte-Real, navigator (ship shown on stamp, 1966)
 Jaime Cortesão, historian and politician (1980)
 Pêro da Covilhã, diplomat and explorer (1988)
 Afonso Costa, politician (1979)
 , sculptor (1971)
 Francisco Rodrigues da Cruz, priest, blessed (1960)
 Álvaro Cunhal, politician (2005)
 Marie Curie, Polish physicist and chemist (1998)

D 

 Charles Darwin, English naturalist (2009)
 Humberto Delgado, air force general and politician (2006)
 João de Deus, poet (1996)
 Bartolomeu Dias, explorer (1945; 1992)
 Dinis I, king (1955; 1976; 1997)
 Walt Disney, American filmmaker, animator and entrepreneur (2001)
 , architect (1949)
 José Domingues dos Santos, politician (1980)
 Martinho de Dume, archbishop and saint (1953)

E 

 Gil Eanes, explorer (1945; 1984; 1991)
 Eça de Queiroz, novelist (1995; 2000)
 António Egas Moniz, neurologist (1966; 1974; 1983; 1999)
 Albert Einstein, Swiss physicist (2000; 2005)
 Eleanor, queen (1958; 1985)
 , journalist and politician (1979)
 Elizabeth of Portugal, queen and saint (1958)
 Robert Esnault-Pelterie, French spaceflight theorist (1975)
 Florbela Espanca, poet (1994)
 Ricardo Espírito Santo, banker and philanthropist (2003)
 Eusébio, footballer (2005)

F 
 Filipe Faísca, fashion designer (2004)
 , Galician count (1983)
 Pedro Fernandes de Queiroz, navigator (1994)
 , colonial liberator and governor (1968)
 Fernando, prince and saint (1949)
 Fernando I, king (1955)
 Fernando II, king of Aragon (1994)
 Fernando II, duke of Braganza (1965)
 Fernando IV, king of Castile (1997)
 , merchant and philanthropist (1993)
 José Maria Ferreira de Castro, writer (1998)
  (1853-1923), chemist (1956)
 Fialho de Almeida, writer (2007)
 Filipa de Lencastre, queen (1949)
 Francis of Assisi, Italian monk and saint (1982; 2009)
 Francisco Xavier, missionary (1952; 2006)
 , sculptor (1971)
 Luís Fróis, missionary (1997)

G 

 Gabriel, archangel (1962; 1993)
 Carlos Viegas Gago Coutinho, aviator pioneer (1923; 1969; 1972)
 Vasco da Gama, explorer (1898; 1911; 1945; 1969; 1980; 1992; 1996; 1997; 1998)
 Ruy Roque Gameiro, sculptor (1971)
 , oncologist (1999)
 Robert H. Goddard, American rocket scientist (1975)
 Bento de Góis, missionary, explorer (1968)
 Damião de Góis, philosopher (1974; 2002)
 Guilherme Gomes Fernandes (1850-1902), firefighter (1953)
 Diogo Gomes, explorer (1991)
 Estêvão Gomes, cartographer and explorer (1993)
 Francisco Gomes Teixeira, mathematician (1952)
 José Manuel Gonçalves, fashion designer (2004)
 , patriot (1973)
 Joana de Gouveia, heroine of Independence (1928)
 Guerra Junqueiro, poet (1951)
 Guiomar de Sá Vilhena, landowner (1996 - Madeira)
 Calouste Gulbenkian, Armenian oil pioneer, philanthropist, art collector (1965; 2006)
 Bartolomeu de Gusmão, inventor (1983)

H 

 Paul Harris, American founder of Rotary Clubs (2005)
 Henrique, o Navegador, prince, patron of exploration (1894; 1935; 1949; 1960; 1994)
 Henrique de Borgonha, count of Portugal (1996)
 Alexandre Herculano, novelist and historian (1977)
 , cartoonist (2005)
 , singer (1996)
 Rowland Hill, English postal reformer (1940; 1990)
 , poet (2004)

I 

 Innocent III, pope (2009)
 Isabel, queen of Portugal and saint (1958)
 Isabel de Portugal, Duchess  of Burgundy (1991)
 Roberto Ivens, explorer and colonial administrator (1998)

J 

 James the Greater, apostle and patron saint of Spain (1984)
 Jesus, central figure of Christianity (1974; 1977; 1979; 1981; 1983; 1995; 2000)
 Joana, princess and blessed, called saint in Portugal (1953)
 João I, king (1926; 1983; 1949; 2004; 2007)
 João II, king (1981; 1992; 1994)
 João IV, king (1926; 1940; 1995; 2004)
 João VI, king (2008)
 João de Deus, saint (1950; 1995)
 John XXI, pope (1977)
 John Paul II, pope (1982; 2000)
 , hygienist (1966; 1999; 2008)
 José I, king (1969; 1995)
 Joseph, saint, husband of Mary (1974; 1977; 1979; 1981; 1983)

K 

 Alfredo Keil, composer and painter (1990)
 Robert Koch, German physician (1982)

L 

 , painter and cartoonist (2005)
 José Leite de Vasconcelos, ethnographer (1966)
 , medical historian (1966)
 José Leitão de Barros, film director (1996)
 Leonor de Avis, queen (1958; 1985)
 João de Lisboa, navigator (1993)
 Duarte Lobo, composer (1974)
 Carlos Lopes, long-distance runner and footballer (2005)
 Fátima Lopes, fashion designer (2004)
 Fernão Lopes, chronicler (1949; 1995)
 Henrique Lopes de Mendonça, poet and playwright (1990)
 , navigator (1994)
 Fernando Lopes-Graça, composer (2006)
 António Lopes Ribeiro, film director (1996)
 Ilse Losa, novelist (2013)
 Luís I, king (1862–64; 1866–67; 1867–70; 1870–76; 1879–90; 1880–81; 1882–83; 1884–87; 1884; 1892–1893; 1980; 1989; 2002)

M 

 Bernardino Machado, president (2001)
 Fernão de Magalhães, explorer (1945; 1993)
 , journalist and statesman (1978)
 Ferdinand Magellan, explorer (1945; 1993)
 José Malhoa, painter (2005)
 Manuel I, king (1995; 1996)
 Manuel II, king (1910)
 João Abel Manta, cartoonist (2005)
 Guglielmo Marconi, Italian inventor (2000)
 Maria I, queen (1997)
 Maria II, queen (1853; 1935; 1953; 2003)
 Mark the Evangelist, apostle (1993)
 Bernardo Marques, painter (painting shown 1998)
 Martinho de Dume, archbishop and saint (1953)
 Osvaldo Martins, fashion designer (2004)
 Jaime Martins Barata, painter (1999)
 Jacinta and Francisco Marto, siblings who saw visions of Mary (1992; 2000)
 Mary, saint, mother of Jesus (1946; 1950; 1956; 1967; 1974; 1977; 1979; 1981; 1983; 1993; 2000)
 Fernão Mendes Pinto, explorer (1980)
 Emílio Garrastazu Médici, Brazilian president (1973)
 , graphic artist (2006)
 Gonçalo Mendes da Maia, knight, military commander (1927)
 Michael, archangel (1993)
 Carolina Michaëlis, philologist (2001; 2009)
 , mathematician (2008)
 Jean Monnet, French statesman (1988)
 , politician, promoter of autonomy for the Azores (1995 - Azores)
 , politician, promoter of autonomy for the Azores (1995 - Azores)
 , fashion designer (2004)
 Wolfgang Amadeus Mozart, Austrian composer (1993; 2006)

N 

 Natália Correia, poet (1996 - Azores)
 Vitorino Nemésio, poet (1999 - Azores, 2001)
 , football (soccer) enthusiast (2005)
 Manuel da Nóbrega, missionary (1954)
 José Norton de Matos, politician (1980; 1999)
 João da Nova, Galician explorer (1992)
 Pedro Nunes, mathematician and geographer (1978; 2002)

O 

 Hermann Oberth, Romanian rocket scientist (1975)
 Manoel de Oliveira, film director (2008)
 Joaquim Pedro de Oliveira Martins, historian and politician (1994)
 Our Lady of Fátima (1950; 1967)
 Our Lady of the Conception (1946; 1997)

P 

 Duarte Pacheco Pereira, explorer and cartographer (1993)
 Gualdim Pais, crusader, knight (1928)
 Passos Manuel, politician (1986)
 Vincent de Paul, French saint (1963)
 , cinema pioneer (1996)
 Pedro I, king (1955)
 Pedro IV, king, also emperor of Brazil as Pedro I (1972; 1984)
 Pedro V, king (1855–56; 1856–58; 1961; 2002)
 António Pedro, painter, writer, actor (2009)
 António Xavier Pereira Coutinho, botanist (1966)
 Soeiro Pereira Gomes, writer (2009)
 Bartolomeu Perestrelo, explorer (1990)
 Fernando Pessoa, poet (1975; 1985; 2000)
 Raul Maria Pereira , architect (2007)
 Philip the Good, Duke of Burgundy (1991)
 Philippa of Lancaster, queen (1949)
 , conspirator (1927)
 Manuel Pinto da Fonseca, Grandmaster (2013)
 Pius XII, pope (1951)
 Marquis of Pombal, statesman (1972; 1982; 1999)
 Marcos Portugal, composer (1974)
 Henrique Pousão, painter (2009)

Q 
 Virgínia Quaresma, (1882-1973), journalist (2009)
 Antero de Quental, poet (1991)

R 

 João das Regras, jurist (1927; 1949)
 José Régio, writer (2001)
 Pedro Reinel, cartographer (1985)
 José Relvas, politician (2008)
 Aquilino Ribeiro, novelist (1985)
 Pilar Ribeiro, mathematician (2011)
 , painter and engraver (1986)
 João Rodrigues Cabrilho, explorer (1969; 1994)
 José Rodrigues Miguéis, writer (2001)
 Gioachino Rossini, Italian composer (1993)

S 

 Francisco Sá Carneiro, political leader (1990)
 Sacadura Cabral, aviator (1923; 1972)
 , fashion designer (2004)
 António de Oliveira Salazar, prime minister, dictator (1971)
  (known as "Sam"), cartoonist (his character Guarda Ricardo shown, 2005)
 José Saramago, novelist (1998)
 Luís Sanchez , fashion designer (2004)
 Sancho I, king (1955)
 Sancho II, king (1955)
 Sebastião Sanhudo, cartoonist (2005)
 , sculptor (1971)
 Lúcia Santos, nun who saw visions of Mary (1992)
 , physician and art historian (1999)
 Vasco Santana actor (1996)
 Sebastião I, king (1990)
 Carlos Seixas, composer (1974)
 António Sérgio, thinker and educator (1980)
 Alexandre de Serpa Pinto, explorer and colonial administrator (1980)
 José António Serrano (1851-1904), surgeon, anatomist (1966)
 , industrialist (2008)
 António Silva, film actor (1996)
 Agostinho da Silva, philosopher (2006)
 Eusébio da Silva Ferreira, footballer (2005)
 Manuel da Silva Passos, politician (1986)
 Diogo de Silves, explorer (1990)
 José Simões de Almeida (sobrinho) (1880-1950), sculptor (1971)
 Tomé de Sousa, governor-general of Brazil (1972)
 João de Sousa Carvalho, composer (1974)
 Emília de Sousa Costa (1877-1959), feminist, women's education advocate and author (2009)
 Aristides de Sousa Mendes, diplomat (1995)
 Amadeo de Souza Cardoso, painter (1987)
 Heinrich von Stephan, German postmaster general (1999)

T 

 Manuel Teixeira Gomes, politician and writer (1980)
 António Teixeira Lopes, sculptor (1971)
 José António Tenente , fashion designer (2004)
 Teotónio, saint (1958)
 Teresa de Leão, countess of Portugal (1996)
 Luísa Todi, mezzo-soprano (1974)
 Miguel Torga, writer (2007)
 Nuno Tristão, explorer (1991)
 Konstantin Tsiolkovsky, Russian rocket scientist (1975)

V 
 Francisco Valença  (1882-1962), illustrator and cartoonist (2005)
 Luís Mendes de Vasconcellos, colonial governor and Grandmaster (2013)
 Tristão Vaz Teixeira, explorer (1990)
 Maria Veleda (1871-1955), feminist (2009)
 Gonçalo Velho, explorer (1945, 1989 - Azores)
 Cesário Verde, poet (1957)
 Giuseppe Verdi, Italian composer (1993)
 José Vianna da Motta, composer (1969)
 Gil Vicente, playwright (1937)
 Angelina Vidal, feminist writer (2009)
 António Vieira, missionary, writer and orator (1997; 2008)
 Maria Helena Vieira da Silva, painter (1996; 2008)
 Filipa de Vilhena, patriot (1926)
 António Manoel de Vilhena, Grandmaster (2013)
 , jazz musician (2009)
 Vímara Peres, count of Portugal (1995)
 Vincent of Saragossa, patron saint of Lisbon (1995)
 Virgin of the Annuciation (1993)

W 

 Richard Wagner, German composer (1993)

Z 

 João Gonçalves Zarco, explorer (1945; 1968; 1981; 1990)
 Zeno, saint (1962)

References

Portugal
Stamps
Philately of Portugal